This is a list of publicly known Disney attractions that were never built; that is, rides, shows, and other Disney park attractions which never reached the final building stage. Some of them were fully designed and not built, often due to budget cuts. Others were concepts, sometimes with preliminary artwork. Some ideas were later reused in other attractions.

Theme parks

Properties

Resorts

Disneyland

Walt Disney World

Resort attractions

Theme park lands

Disneyland

Walt Disney World

Magic Kingdom

Epcot

Disney's Hollywood Studios

Disney's Animal Kingdom

Hong Kong Disneyland

Attractions

Disneyland

Walt Disney World

Disney's Animal Kingdom

Disney's Hollywood Studios

Epcot

Magic Kingdom

Restaurants

Disney's Hollywood Studios

References

External links 
 The Neverland Files – A website showcasing never built Disney projects

 
Never built